Hyllus giganteus, commonly referred to as the giant jumping spider, is a jumping spider native from Sumatra to Australia. It is popular among spider hobbyists and breeders as the largest known jumping spider.

Discovery 
The giant jumping spider was first discovered in 1846 by German arachnologist Carl Ludwig Koch and was first mentioned in his cowritten book The arachnids: depicted and described true to nature.

Description 
Hyllus giganteus is often confused for other species, especially Hyllus diardi. It can be distinguished by its large size and distinctive stripes at the top of its "face" and black band across the head. It has two white lines running down the sides of its body. Males and females often have different colorations.

References 

Salticidae
Spiders of Australia